Moses Allen (July 30, 1907 – February 2, 1983) was an American jazz bassist.

Career 
Allen began professionally playing music in 1927 after he joined Jimmie Lunceford's band, where he played the tuba. He switched to bass in 1932, remaining with Lunceford's orchestra until 1942. Allen's bass playing was a key element in the highly-influential Lunceford ensemble. Allen was also an early experimenter with the electric bass. Among his best-known recordings with Lunceford is the tune "In Dat Mornin'".

After leaving Lunceford's orchestra, Allen opened a music store in New York City, playing occasional gigs until the 1960s. Allen died in New York City in 1983.

References

External links
 Moses Allen recordings at the Discography of American Historical Recordings.

1907 births
1983 deaths
American jazz bass guitarists
American male bass guitarists
American jazz double-bassists
Male double-bassists
Musicians from Memphis, Tennessee
20th-century American bass guitarists
Guitarists from Tennessee
Jazz musicians from Tennessee
20th-century double-bassists
20th-century American male musicians
American male jazz musicians